Aleksejs is a Latvian-language masculine given name.

People named Aleksejs include:
Aleksejs Auziņš, Latvian footballer
Aleksejs Jurjevs, Latvian cyclist
Aleksejs Rumjancevs, Latvian canoer
Aleksejs Šarando, Latvian footballer
Aleksejs Saramotins, Latvian cyclist
Aleksejs Semjonovs, Latvian footballer
Aleksejs Širokovs, ice hockey player
Aleksejs Vidavskis, Latvian politician
Aleksejs Višņakovs, footballer

Latvian masculine given names
Given names